The Elbow River is a river in southern Alberta, Canada. It flows from the Canadian Rockies to the city of Calgary, where it merges into the Bow River.

Course 
The Elbow River originates at Elbow Lake in the Front Range of the Canadian Rocky Mountains of southwestern Alberta draining a watershed of 1235 km2. The river extends from a largely forested headwater region through alpine, sub-alpine, boreal foothills, and aspen parkland ecoregions, to a predominantly agricultural mid-region of improved pasture with dispersed cattle grazing and accompanying forage crop production, and thereafter through the city of Calgary under the influence of the urban environment.

The Elbow River originates from Elbow Lake in the Elbow-Sheep Wildland Provincial Park in the Canadian Rockies, then continues through the Rocky Mountain foothills and flows into the hamlet of Bragg Creek.  The Elbow River passes under Highway 22 and then travels through the rural community of Springbank and the Tsuu T'ina Nation 145 Indian reserve directly west of Calgary. The river enters the City of Calgary at the Weaselhead Flats, an artificial inland delta, and into the Glenmore Reservoir, one of Calgary's two chief sources of drinking water. From there, it flows northward through residential communities towards the city centre, is crossed by Macleod Trail, passes the Calgary Stampede grounds and finally joins the Bow River west of the Calgary Zoo.

Tributaries 
Little Elbow River
Quirk Creek
Canyon Creek
Iron Creek
Bragg Creek
Harris Creek
Pirmez Creek
Millburn Creek
Springbank Creek
Cullen Creek
May Creek
Lott Creek

Flora and fauna 
Dominant vegetation in the upper Elbow River drainage basin includes trembling aspen (Populus tremuloides), balsam poplar (P. balsamifera), lodgepole pine (Pinus contorta) and white spruce (Picea glauca). Soils in the Elbow watershed are primarily black chernozemics, orthic gray luvisols, eutric brunisols, and coarse loam overlying glaciofluvial gravels (Mitchell and Prepas 1990). Land use in the upper Elbow watershed is centered primarily on recreation, including camping, hiking, biking, equestrian, and some limited off-road vehicle activity. Logging, oil and gas production, and cattle grazing leases are also present.

Human influence 

Fort Calgary (the North-West Mounted Police post established in 1873 around which settlement in the Calgary area began) was located at the confluence of the Bow and Elbow rivers.

In terms of human influence, the Elbow River flows through the communities of Bragg Creek (population approx. 580) and Redwood Meadows (population approx. 980) in the foothills of the Rockies. Below these communities, the Elbow River flows through Tsuut’ina Nation 145 and country residential estates such as Elbow Valley. Closer to Calgary, the Elbow River flows through acreage lot development.  The Elbow River enters the city of Calgary from the west, where it takes a very meandering path for approximately 14 kilometers before it is impounded to form the Glenmore Reservoir from which the Glenmore Water Treatment Plant receives its drinking water supply. Within the urban environment, the Elbow River flows approximately 11.5 kilometers downstream of the Glenmore Reservoir before joining the Bow River.

Water quality  

The Elbow River is the source of 40% of the drinking water for the City of Calgary (City of Calgary 2021), which has a current population of over 1.2 million (City of Calgary Census 2019). Within Calgary, there are nine stormwater outfalls draining urban catchments above the Glenmore Reservoir and 88 stormwater outfalls draining urban catchments between the reservoir and where the Elbow River joins the Bow River. 

The Government of Alberta, Rocky View County, the University of Calgary and The City of Calgary have water quality sampling programs along the Elbow River, including occasional monitoring in a few tributaries. However, The City of Calgary has the best body of water quality data for the Elbow River. Historically, 17 sites in the Elbow River watershed were monitored at different times. These sites included tributaries to the Elbow River, the Elbow River mainstem and the Glenmore Reservoir. Currently, seven sites in the Elbow River mainstem and four sites in the Glenmore Reservoir are being actively monitored. 

The Elbow River is popular among canoers, rafters, campers, and hikers and runs through several features including Forgetmenot Pond, and Elbow Falls.  Sections of the river are closed to fishing or are "catch-and-release" waters.

Floods

The water flow of the Elbow River fluctuates significantly, and in June 2005 a flood occurred that was so severe (the heaviest in at least two centuries according to Alberta Government estimates) that the water flowed over the Glenmore Dam.  Approximately 1,500 Calgarians living downstream were evacuated. Another, more extensive flood began on 20 June 2013, with tens of thousands of evacuations.

In June 2013, Alberta, Canada, experienced heavy rainfall that triggered catastrophic flooding throughout much of the southern half of the province along the Bow, Elbow, Highwood and Oldman rivers and tributaries. A dozen municipalities in Southern Alberta declared local states of emergency on 20 June as water levels rose and numerous communities were placed under evacuation orders.

Gallery

See also
 List of rivers of Alberta

References

Rivers of Alberta
Rivers of the Canadian Rockies
Bow River